BOL House is a of Pakistani youth-based reality show that aired on BOL Network with episodes also available online. The series premiered on 18 December 2021.

Filming of the show takes place at the BOL House in Korangi Creek Cantonment, Karachi which partially serves as BOL Network's headquarters. Like the first series, contestants lived in the house for 30 days from 4 January to 4 February 2022 until four finalists emerged.

Format
The show is a Pakistani adaptation of the Indian reality show Bigg Boss. Hosted by Aamir Liaquat Hussain, it used a mixed format which incorporated open auditions for contestant selection who were then later confined to a Big Brother-style surveillance house. The contestants would leave the house occasionally to perform tasks where performance outcomes along with nominations would result in elimination of one or more housemates.

Contestants
Names, and cities stated are at time of filming.

Progress history

  This housemate was immune from eviction
  This housemate won the elimination challenge and was declared safe from eviction

Notes

References

External links
 

BOL Network
Pakistani reality television series
Race-related controversies in television
Television controversies in Pakistan
2021 Pakistani television series debuts
Pakistani television series based on non-Pakistani television series